Bull Creek is a  tributary of the Los Angeles River in the San Fernando Valley of Los Angeles County, California.

The creek rises in Bull Canyon on Oat Mountain.  After leaving its canyon, it is encased in a concrete flood control channel, wherein it runs south from Granada Hills though North Hills, Van Nuys (including its airport), and Lake Balboa. South of Victory Boulevard, the river reverts to a free-flowing stream and joins the Los Angeles River inside the Sepulveda Dam Recreation Area. Since 2009 this section has been restored under a federally funded ecosystem restoration project, in part to protect the important riparian habitat.

In 1971, on the morning of the Sylmar earthquake, residents of Granada Hills, Northridge, North Hills, and Van Nuys who were living between Balboa Boulevard and the San Diego Freeway were evacuated after the Lower Van Norman Dam nearly broke.  However, a great flood down the banks of Bull Creek was averted.

In 1991, the truck chase scenes from Terminator 2: Judgment Day were filmed in Bull Creek, starting at the Hayvenhurst Avenue/Plummer Street crossing.

Crossings and tributaries
From mouth to source (year built in parentheses):

Road in Lake Balboa Park
Metro G Line
Bicycle path
Victory Boulevard (1955)
Haynes Street [Pedestrian Bridge]
Vanowen Street (1954)
Sherman Way (1954)
Saticoy Street (1954)
Stagg Street (1955)
Road in Van Nuys Airport
Taxiway in Van Nuys Airport
Roscoe Boulevard (1955)
Railroad: Union Pacific Coast Line
Parthenia Street (1955)
Nordhoff Street (1955)

Hayvenhurst Avenue & Plummer Street (1974)
Granada Channel enters
Lassen Street (1973)
Mayall Street [Pedestrian Bridge]
Devonshire Street (1956)
Chatsworth Street (1956)
Celtic Street (1976)
Bull Creek Canyon Channel Bridge carrying State Route 118 (Ronald Reagan Freeway) - twin bridges (original 1978, rebuilt 1994 after the Northridge earthquake)
San Fernando Mission Road (1962)
John F. Kennedy High School
Simonds Street (1978)
Rinaldi Street & Woodley Avenue (1962)
Stranwood Avenue

References

External links

SepulvedaBasinWildlife.org - Bull Creek

Rivers of Los Angeles County, California
Tributaries of the Los Angeles River
Geography of the San Fernando Valley
Santa Susana Mountains
Granada Hills, Los Angeles
Mission Hills, Los Angeles
Van Nuys, Los Angeles
Rivers of Southern California